Con Kelly (c. 1935 – after 1956) was a Canadian football player who played for the Edmonton Eskimos. He won the Grey Cup with the Eskimos in 1955 and 1956. Kelly was raised and played junior football in Edmonton.

References

1930s births
Year of death missing
Edmonton Elks players
Canadian football people from Edmonton
Players of Canadian football from Alberta